Richard Bell (died c. 1417), of Lincoln, was an English politician.

He was elected Mayor of Lincoln for 1411–12 and a member (MP) of the Parliament of England for Lincoln in 1407.

References

14th-century births
1417 deaths
Members of the Parliament of England (pre-1707) for Lincoln
Mayors of Lincoln, England
English MPs 1407